Southern Broadcasting Network, Inc. (SBN) is a Filipino-owned media company based radio and television network based in Metro Manila. SBN is a subsidiary of Solar Entertainment Corporation, a Filipino-owned television company managed by the Tieng family.

Its main broadcast facilities are located at the Third Floor, Worldwide Corporate Center, EDSA corner Shaw Boulevard, Mandaluyong with office located at 22/F Strata 2000 Building, F. Ortigas Jr. Road, Ortigas Center, Pasig (sharing space with religious broadcaster, ZOE Broadcasting Network).

Southern Broadcasting Network operates television stations with airtime being leased by its parent Solar Entertainment, serving as primary broadcasters of movie and entertainment channel SolarFlix. SBN also operates 2 regional FM radio stations under the brand XFM Philippines in Cebu and Davao and 1 regional FM radio station under the brand XStream FM in Bacolod, serving as partial affiliate of Yes2Health Advertising.

History

World TV/SBN era (1992–2007)
SBN was founded by Gem Communications Holdings Corporation (GemCom) majority owned by Filipino-Chinese tycoon Lucio Co, founder of supermarket chain Puregold Price Club Inc. with 97% share. Leonardo B. Dayao and Teofilo A. Henson served as chairman and president of SBN, respectively.

The Davao-based broadcast company launched DWCP-TV channel 21, on May 30, 1992, becoming the first local UHF TV station in Metro Manila. It was then known as World TV 21, which was operated by the Kampana Television Corporation, providing programming content from ABC, ESPN and CNN.

On September 7, 1995, SBN was granted a 25-year legislative franchise under Republic Act No. 8147, albeit without Philippine President Fidel V. Ramos' signature as the bill lapsed into law after 30 days of inaction.

In 2000, SBN started airing Ang Dating Daan after transferring from PTV, as well as informative and educational programs, and the most notable program during the network's popularity, SBN Music Videos, which later evolved as SBN 21 Live, a videoke oriented program. In 2001, the Iglesia ni Cristo launched its own program, Ang Tamang Daan, as a direct response to Ang Dating Daan, featuring video footages and recordings of ADD hosts as issues were tackled. Over time the animosity between the two groups has intensified, and their relationship has been severely strained. The Quezon City Regional Trial Court on Wednesday ordered televangelist Bro. Eliseo Soriano of Ang Dating Daan to pay the Iglesia ni Cristo, P100,000 in moral damages for libel committed 10 years ago. Branch 92 Judge Eleuterio Bathan also directed him to pay a fine of P6,000 each for two counts of libel. He ruled the elements of libel have been established in the case filed by INC over Soriano's pronouncement on a television program on April 25, 2003, and the replay on April 27 on the same timeslot during the live program of Ang Dating Daan on SBN.

The case stemmed from a complaint filed by members of the Iglesia ni Cristo, including its minister Michael Sandoval, due to statements of Soriano aired on August 10 referring to the minister. By 2004, Ang Dating Daan transferred to UNTV, while Ang Tamang Daan moved to the INC's secular television station Net 25.

New Management (2008–present)

Blocktime agreement and Subsequent purchase by Solar

On January 1, 2008, Solar Entertainment Corporation began to lease airtime on SBN, choosing to broadcast programming from its entertainment channel ETC. Months prior to the deal, SkyCable stated that they would offer less "redundant" programming and feature more series that had never been aired in the country before, but reports surfaced that channels operated by Solar were pulled due to a dispute; SkyCable's owner, ABS-CBN Corporation, believed that Solar's lower fees for advertising on its channels were causing ABS-CBN to lose revenue. The new blocktime deal between SBN, Radio Philippines Network, Rajah Broadcasting Network, and Solar is said to be a part of the latter's retaliation to Sky.

In mid-2010, GemCom sold all of its 97% equity share in SBN to Solar Entertainment for Php 368.8 million. Since then, SBN became a fully owned subsidiary of Solar.

When Solar Entertainment's former channel Solar TV expanded as a broadcast television company, after Solar acquired a 34% majority stake of RPN, ETC was transferred to RPN. Meanwhile, SBN and Solar created news and talk channel Talk TV, with both parties enjoying a 50% share of the channel. The newly created channel conducted its test broadcast until March 31, 2011, with full operation commencing on April 1, 2011. By January 16, 2012, Talk TV became the first home of Solar's newly created division, Solar News. The first local news event covered was the Renato Corona impeachment trial. On October 30, Talk TV was relaunched as the Solar News Channel. Though it was claimed as "the first 24-hour English news channel on free-to-air TV", SBN (who holds free-to-air broadcast rights of SNC) never materialized SNC's slogan.

On December 1, 2013, Solar News Channel moved to RPN to allow SNC's wider coverage, while ETC returned to SBN a day before. (SNC and RPN, however, were sold to ALC Group of Companies chair, the late Amb. Antonio Cabangon Chua, in August the following year, due to the Tieng's loss of revenue after investing on RPN.)

On July 26, 2019, Philippine President Rodrigo Duterte signed Republic Act No. 11354 which renewed SBN's legislative franchise for another 25 years. The law granted SBN a franchise to construct, install, operate, and maintain, for commercial purposes, radio broadcasting stations and television stations, including digital television system, with the corresponding facilities such as relay stations, throughout the Philippines.

Programming

SolarFlix Programs

SBN Previously Programs

Southern Broadcasting Network stations Nationwide

SBN television stations

Analog

Digital

SBN radio stations

FM stations

Inactive Stations

References

External links
ETC official website
Asean Media: SBN

 
Philippine radio networks
Television networks in the Philippines
Filipino-language television stations
Mass media companies of the Philippines
Television in Metro Manila
Companies based in Mandaluyong
Television channels and stations established in 1992
Entertainment companies established in 1970
Mass media companies established in 1970
Philippine companies established in 1970
Solar Entertainment Corporation